Saruta Dam  is a dam in the Niigata Prefecture, Japan, completed in 1955.

References 

Dams in Niigata Prefecture
Dams completed in 1955
1955 establishments in Japan